Lama Abu-Odeh (born 1962) is a Palestinian-American professor and author who teaches at the Georgetown University Law Center. She has written extensively on Islamic law, feminism, and family law.

Early life and education
Abu-Odeh was born in Amman, Jordan in 1962. She is the daughter of Adnan Abu-Odeh, a former senator in the Jordanian House of Parliament and ambassador.  She earned her LL.B. from the University of Jordan, her LL.M. from the University of Bristol, England, her MA from the University of York, England, and her S.J.D. from Harvard University.

She has taught at Stanford Law School and worked for the World Bank's Middle East/North Africa division.

Abu-Odeh has also written on the Israeli-Palestinian conflict and has voiced support for binationalism and a one-state solution.

References

 Profile of Lama Abu-Odeh at the Institute for Middle East Understanding
 Georgetown Law Full-Time Faculty Biography
 The Case for Bi-Nationalism: Why one state — liberal and constitutionalist — may be the key to peace in the Middle East, The Boston Review, December 2001-January 2002

1962 births
Living people
People from Amman
American people of Palestinian descent
Jordanian feminists
Palestinian women writers
Palestinian feminists
Harvard Law School alumni
Stanford Law School faculty
Alumni of the University of York
University of Jordan alumni
20th-century Palestinian writers
20th-century Palestinian women
21st-century Palestinian writers
21st-century Palestinian women
20th-century Palestinian women writers
21st-century Palestinian women writers
American legal scholars
American women legal scholars
Jordanian emigrants to the United States
Georgetown University Law Center faculty